Alexander Island is the largest island in Antarctica.

Alexander Island may also refer to:
Alexander Island (Nunavut)
Alexander Island (Collie River), an island in the Collie River, Western Australia
Alexander Island (Fitzroy River), an island in the Fitzroy River, Western Australia
Alexander Island (Houtman Abrolhos), an island in the Houtman Abrolhos, Western Australia
Rakahanga, formerly called Alexander Island in the Cook Islands
Alexander Island (Texas) in Houston Texas
Alexander Islands, in the Russian Arctic